Garrison School Historic District is a national historic district located at Liberty, Clay County, Missouri.  It encompasses six contributing buildings associated with the African-American community of Liberty. The district developed between about 1900 and 1942, and contains a variety of National Folk housing types, as well as the brick Garrison School and the limestone African Methodist Church.

It was listed on the National Register of Historic Places in 2001.

References

African-American history of Missouri
Historic districts on the National Register of Historic Places in Missouri
Buildings and structures in Clay County, Missouri
National Register of Historic Places in Clay County, Missouri